The Wildhorse Saloon is a country/western-themed restaurant, live music venue, and dance club located in downtown Nashville, Tennessee. It is managed by Marriott and owned by  Ryman Hospitality Properties (formerly known as Gaylord Entertainment Company). Originally opened on June 1, 1994 in a converted warehouse, the Wildhorse initially capitalized on the line dancing craze of the early-to-mid-1990s. While it continues to enjoy success as a bar and line dance venue, it has become a successful concert venue in recent years for all genres of music. Because of its downtown location, open bar, large atrium, and permanent stage, the Wildhorse is also often used as a formal banquet hall. 

The Wildhorse consists of three levels. The top two levels overlook the dance floor and stage.

In media
The Wildhorse once housed a full-service radio studio, formerly used by WSM-FM when the station was also under Gaylord ownership. It featured large windows and multiple sets of headphones hung outside so anyone could watch and listen to what was going on in the studio. Nationally syndicated radio personality Rich Miller (Power Country with Rich Miller) once hosted a popular 7-midnight live show in the studio. Top Country stars and other celebrities would often stop by the studio and visit on air with Rich. During this time Locash singer Chris Lucas was the house DJ. Chris and Rich co-hosted a very popular singing contest called "Sing To Win" which often saw long lines of singers down 2nd avenue. Nightly broadcasting from the studio ended when a freak lightning strike took out the main console. The room was later converted into a small video arcade, and was removed completely during the latest renovation (2016). The venue formerly hosted the Wildhorse Saloon Dance Show on The Nashville Network hosted by Katie Haas in the mid-1990s. It also served as an audition site for the second season of American Idol. More recently, it has served as home of the Idol spin-off Can You Duet on CMT.

Wildhorse Saloon at Walt Disney World
A second Wildhorse opened at Pleasure Island at the Walt Disney World Resort in Lake Buena Vista, Florida, replacing the Fireworks Factory restaurant. It operated as a joint venture of Gaylord Entertainment and Levy Restaurants from 1998 to 2001. Gaylord and Levy sold their interests in the building to Disney in 2001, which replaced it with a top 40 dance club called Motion. Motion closed alongside the rest of Pleasure Island in September 2008, and its building was demolished in late 2010.

References

External links
Wildhorse Saloon - official site

Culture of Nashville, Tennessee
Ryman Hospitality Properties
Music venues in Tennessee
Nightclubs in the United States
Restaurants in Nashville, Tennessee
Restaurants established in 1994
1994 establishments in Tennessee
Western-themed restaurants